The Han conquest of Nanyue was a military conflict between the Han Empire and the Nanyue kingdom in modern Guangdong, Guangxi, and Northern Vietnam. During the reign of Emperor Wu, the Han forces launched a punitive campaign against Nanyue and conquered it in 111 BC.

Background

During the collapse of the Qin dynasty, Zhao Tuo established himself as the King of Nanyue in southern China. Zhao was originally a Qin military officer from Zhending in northern China. The Han frontier in the south was not threatened and there was no indication that Zhao Tuo would encroach on Han territory. In 196 BC, the Emperor Gaozu sent Lu Jia on a diplomatic mission to Nanyue to officially recognize Zhao Tuo as a local ruler. Nevertheless, relations between Han and Nanyue were sometimes strained. Zhao Tuo resented Empress Lü's ban on exports of metal wares and female livestock to Nanyue. In 183 BC, he proclaimed himself the "Martial Emperor of the Southern Yue" (南越武帝), which implied a perceived status on equal footing with the Han emperor. Two years later, Nanyue attacked the Changsha Kingdom, a constituent kingdom of the Han empire. In 180 BC, Lu Jia led a diplomatic mission to Nanyue. During negotiations, he succeeded in convincing Zhao Tuo to give up on his title as emperor and pay homage to Han as a nominal vassal.

In 135 BC, King Zhao Mo of Nanyue appealed to the Han court for help against attacking Minyue forces. The Han court responded swiftly and this led to Zhao Mo's agreement to send his son, Prince Zhao Yingqi, to serve in the palace at Chang'an. Even though Nanyue neglected to pay regular homage to the Han court, the court had its attention focused on other commitments and was not set on forcing the issue. 

At the Nanyue court in 113 BC, the Queen Dowager of Nanyue suggested incorporating Nanyue as a kingdom under the suzerainty of the Han empire, thus formally integrating the kingdom on the same terms as the other constituent kingdoms of the Han empire. She was Chinese herself and was married to Zhao Yingqi. However, many Nanyue ministers opposed this suggestion. Lü Jia was the primary Nanyue official to oppose the idea and he led the opposition against the Queen Dowager. In 112 BC, the opposition retaliated violently and executed the Queen Dowager, a provocation that led to the mobilization of a large Han naval force into Nanyue.

Course
The Han forces comprised six armies, who traveled by sea, directly southward, or from Sichuan along the Xi River. In 111 BC, General Lu Bode and General Yang Pu advanced towards Panyu (present-day Guangzhou). This resulted in the surrender of Nanyue to the Han empire later that year.

Aftermath

After the conquest of Nanyue in 111 BC, the Han empire established nine new commanderies to administer the former Nanyue territories. Han control proceeded to expand further southwestward by military means after the conquest. Following the conquest, the Han empire gradually extended its overseas trade with the various polities in Southeast Asia and around the Indian Ocean.

See also
 Qin campaign against the Yue tribes

References

Literature 
 
 
 
 

111 BC
110s BC conflicts
2nd century BC in China
2nd century BC in Vietnam
Emperor Wu of Han
Nanyue
Wars involving the Han dynasty
Military campaigns involving Vietnam